Jordi Ausàs i Coll (born 3 March 1960 in La Seu d'Urgell, Alt Urgell) is a Spanish politician from Catalonia, Mayor of La Seu d'Urgell from 2003 to 2008 and Minister of Governance and Public Administration of Catalonia in the José Montilla government (2008–2010). He is a member of Republican Left of Catalonia (ERC).

He is a Catalan language teacher in the University of Barcelona. He was a director of the Andorran School of Escaldes-Engordany in the Principality of Andorra.

Since 2003 he has  been the Mayor of La Seu d'Urgell, in the Province of Lleida, he was reelected on 27 May 2007. Since 30 November 1995 he has been a deputy in the Parliament of Catalonia for Lleida province. He was the president of the Commission of Agriculture, Livestock and Fisheries (29 November 1999 – 17 December 2003).

In the 2008 Spanish general election he was a candidate for Lleida Province, but failed to hold the ERC seat, which was gained by José Ignacio Llorens, the candidate of the People's Party.

On 10 March 2008, Joan Puigcercós resigned, and Ausàs succeeded him.

References

1960 births
Living people
People from La Seu d'Urgell
Republican Left of Catalonia politicians
Members of the Parliament of Catalonia
Ministers of Governance and Public Administration of Catalonia
Mayors of places in Catalonia

Teachers of Catalan